The year 1678 in science and technology involved some significant events.

Astronomy
 Edmund Halley publishes a catalogue of 341 southern stars—the first systematic southern sky survey.

Physics
 Christiaan Huygens publishes his Traité de la Lumière/Treatise on Light, which states his principle of wavefront sources.
 Robert Hooke discovers the fundamental law of elasticity when he finds that the stress (force) exerted is proportional to the strain (elongation) produced.

Zoology
 Publication of English Spiders by Martin Lister, the first book devoted to spiders.

Births
 April 14 – Abraham Darby I, ironmaster (died 1717)
 July 16 – Jakob Hermann, mathematician (died 1733)
 October 27 – Pierre Raymond de Montmort, mathematician (died 1719)
 November 26 – Jean-Jacques d'Ortous de Mairan, geophysicist (died 1771)
 December 2 – Nicolaas Kruik (Cruquius), cartographer and meteorologist (died 1754)
 unknown – Pierre Fauchard, physician and "father of modern dentistry" (died 1761)

Deaths
 November 28 – Willem Piso, physician and naturalist (born 1611)

 
17th century in science
1670s in science